Atatürk Sports Hall is a multi-purpose indoor arena located in the Çukurova district of Adana, situated just north of the Hayal Park. The arena is built by the Greater Adana Municipality and opened on 19 September 2017.

Adana Demirspor A.Ş. volleyball team play their Turkish Women's Volleyball League home matches in the Atatürk Sports Hall.

References

Sport venues in Adana
Indoor arenas in Turkey
Basketball venues in Turkey
Volleyball venues in Turkey
Turkish Basketball League venues
Things named after Mustafa Kemal Atatürk